Shakuntala or Shakuntala looking for Dushyanta is an epic painting by Indian painter Raja Ravi Varma. 

Ravi Varma depicts Shakuntala, an important character of Mahabharata, pretending to remove a thorn from her foot, while actually looking for her husband/lover, Dushyantha, while her friends tease her and call her bluff.

Tapati Guha-Thakurta, an art historian, wrote;

References 

Indian paintings
1898 paintings
Religious paintings
Works based on the Mahabharata
Paintings based on literature
Works based on Shakuntala (play)